The 1876 United States presidential election in Indiana took place on November 7, 1876, as part of the 1876 United States presidential election. Indiana voters chose 15 representatives, or electors, to the Electoral College, who voted for president and vice president.

Indiana was won by Samuel J. Tilden, the former governor of New York (D–New York), running with Thomas A. Hendricks, the governor of Indiana and future vice president, with 48.65% of the popular vote, against Rutherford B. Hayes, the governor of Ohio (R-Ohio), running with Representative William A. Wheeler, with 47.39% of the vote.

The Greenback Party chose industrialist Peter Cooper and former representative Samuel Fenton Cary, received 3.93% of the vote. The Prohibition Party chose former representative Green Clay Smith and Gideon T. Stewart and received 0.03% of the vote.

This is the first time a Democratic presidential candidate would carry the state of Indiana since James Buchanan in 1856, and as of 2020, this is the only presidential election in which the Republican nominee won without carrying Indiana.

Results

See also
 United States presidential elections in Indiana

References

Indiana
1876
1876 Indiana elections